Devin Ruben Pepper (born November 29, 1969) is a United States Space Force brigadier general who served as commander of Buckley Garrison, 460th Space Wing, and the 21st Operations Group. He is the first African American general officer in the Space Force and the first one to have enlisted before commissioning as an officer.

Education 
 1995 Bachelor of Science, Psychology, University of Maryland University College, College Park
 2001 Squadron Officer School, Maxwell Air Force Base, Ala.
 2002 Air Force Strategic Policy Intern, the Pentagon, Arlington, Va.
 2002 Masters of Arts, Organizational Behavior and Leadership, The George Washington University, Washington, D.C.
 2003 Masters of Business Administration, Embry-Riddle Aeronautical University, Daytona Beach, Fla.
 2003 United States Air Force Weapons Instructor Course, Space Superiority Squadron, Nellis AFB, Nev.
 2007 Air Command and Staff College, Maxwell AFB, Ala., by correspondence
 2010 Space 300, National Security Space Institute, Colorado Springs, Colo.
 2013 Air War College, Maxwell AFB, Ala., by correspondence
 2015 Masters of National Security Strategy, National War College, Fort Lesley J. McNair, Washington, D.C.
 2018 Middle East and South Asia Course, Alan L. Freed Associates, Capitol Hill Club, Washington, D.C.
 2021 Senior Leader Orientation Course, Air Force General Officer Management Office, Washington, D.C.

Assignments 

1. May 1996–August 1996, Student, Officer Training School, Maxwell Air Force Base, Ala.
2. August 1996–April 1997, Student, Undergraduate Space and Missile Training and Initial Qualification Training, Minuteman III Rapid Execution and Combat Targeting, Vandenberg AFB, Calif.
3. April 1997–February 1998, Deputy Missile Combat Crew Commander, 740th Missile Squadron, Minot AFB, N.D.
4. February 1998–January 1999, Deputy Missile Combat Crew Commander Evaluator, 91st Operations Group, Minot AFB, N.D.
5. February 1999–November 1999, Missile Combat Crew Commander, 740th Missile Squadron, Minot AFB, N.D.
6. November 1999–July 2001, Missile Combat Crew Commander Instructor, Section Chief and Senior Crew Operations Instructor, 91st Operations Support Squadron, Minot AFB, N.D.
7. August 2001–June 2002, Executive Officer to the Wing Commander, 91st Space Wing, Minot AFB, N.D.
8. June 2002–June 2003, Air Force Strategic Policy Intern with duties in the Office of the Assistant Secretary of the Air Force for Equal Opportunity; and Office of the Deputy Secretary of Defense, the Pentagon, Arlington, Va.
9. January 2004–February 2005, Chief, Offensive Counter-Information, 7th Information Warfare Flight, Osan Air Base, South Korea
10. February 2005–September 2007, Program Manager, Advanced Strike Requirements Branch, Advanced Programs Division, Directorate of Requirements, Air Combat Command, Langley AFB, Va. (March – July 2007, Space Weapons Officer, G-3 Fires and Effects Coordination Cell, II Marine Expeditionary Force (Forward), Camp Fallujah, Iraq)
11. September 2007–August 2009, Executive Officer to the Commander, Eighth Air Force, Barksdale AFB, La.
12. September 2009–June 2011, Deputy Chief, later Chief, Weapons, Tactics and Electronic Warfare Branch, Air Force Global Strike Command, Barksdale AFB, La.
13. June 2011–June 2013, Commander, Air Force Element Operations Squadron, Royal Air Force Menwith Hill, United Kingdom
14. June 2013–July 2014, Deputy Commander, 21st Operations Group, 21st Space Wing, Peterson AFB, Colo.
15. August 2014–June 2015, Student, National War College, National Defense University, Fort Lesley J. McNair, Washington, D.C.
16. July 2015–June 2016, Chief, Global Intelligence Surveillance, and Reconnaissance Future Capabilities Branch (J841), U.S. Strategic Command, Offutt AFB, Neb.
17. June 2016–May 2017, Chief, Space and Missile Defense Division (J31), Headquarters United States Strategic Command, Offutt AFB, Neb.
18. May 2017–May 2019, Commander, 21st Operations Group, 21st Space Wing, Peterson AFB, Colo.
19. May 2019–July 2020, Commander, 460th Space Wing, Buckley AFB, Colo.
20. July 2020–January 2021, Commander, Buckley Garrison, Buckley AFB, Colo.
21. January 2021–April 2021, performing the duties of the Deputy Director of the Strategy, Plans and Policy Directorate (DJ5), Headquarters United States Space Command, Peterson AFB, Colo.
22. April 2021–October 2022, Deputy Director of the Strategy, Plans and Policy Directorate (DJ5), Headquarters United States Space Command, Peterson AFB, Colo.
23. October 2022–present, Deputy Commanding General Operations, Headquarters Space Operations Command, Peterson SFB, Colo.

Awards and decorations 
Pepper is the recipient of the following awards:

 Colonel Dick Scobee Leadership Award (OTS)   
 Distinguished Graduate (Minuteman III IQT)
 Air Force Space Command Instructor and Evaluator of the Year Award
 Air Force Space Command Crewmember Excellence Award
 United States Air Force Verne Orr Award

Dates of promotion

Writing

References 

Living people
Place of birth missing (living people)
United States Air Force colonels
United States Space Force generals
1969 births